Santa Maria delle Grazie is a Catholic church located in Alcamo, in the province of Trapani.

History  
Initially it was a small chapel built in the 17th century; in 1619 they put an image that Pietro Maria Rocca, a scholar from Alcamo, thought it was the triptych realized in 1462 on a board, and moved to the National Museum of Palermo in 1865.

The chapel was enlarged between the years 1626 and 1636, after an event happened on 21 June 1625: miraculously in front of it, the cart carrying the plague victims to the cemetery of Saint Ippolito broke  irremediably, the sign that plague had finished.

Description and works 

The façade was carved by Domenico Marchese in 1627. The church was then  restored in 1898, and in 1914 it was frescoed by  Liborio Mirabile, a painter from Alcamo.

A sculptor from Palermo, Paolo La Licata,  realized the white marble high altar and the floor with polychrome marbles, after the design created in 1914 by Francesco Alesi, a priest and painter from Alcamo.

The Church is with one nave and  three altars: 
High altar: statue of Our Lady of Graces (1925), realized by the firm Malecore from Lecce  
Right altar: statue of  Saint Joseph. 
Left altar: statue of Saint Lucy.

On the south side, on the external wall of the church, there is a wayside shrine with a statue of the Virgin and Child, called Madonna del buon viaggio an Ebron (that is Madonna of the Good Trip to Ebron).  In June 2015 it was subject of an act of sacrilege, in fact they broke an arm of the child Jesus and took it away.

Every year on 2 July, after a triduum of liturgical preparation, they carry the simulacrum of the Madonna in procession as far as the Salesian Oratory in the Church of the Holy Souls, where the end of the festivity takes place.

In 1929 they founded the male Congregation of Mary Most Holy of Graces, which had the scope of solemnizing her feast and the Forty Hours Devotion. 
It has not been existing for years.

References

Sources  
Carlo Cataldo, Guida storico-artistica dei beni culturali di Alcamo-Calatafimi-Castellammare del Golfo p. 83-84; Alcamo, Sarograf, 1982
Salvatore Messina, Alcamo nella storia, nella leggenda e nell'arte p. 141, Alcamo, ed. Campo, 2015

Roman Catholic churches in Alcamo